= Hawke Castle =

Building in California, United States

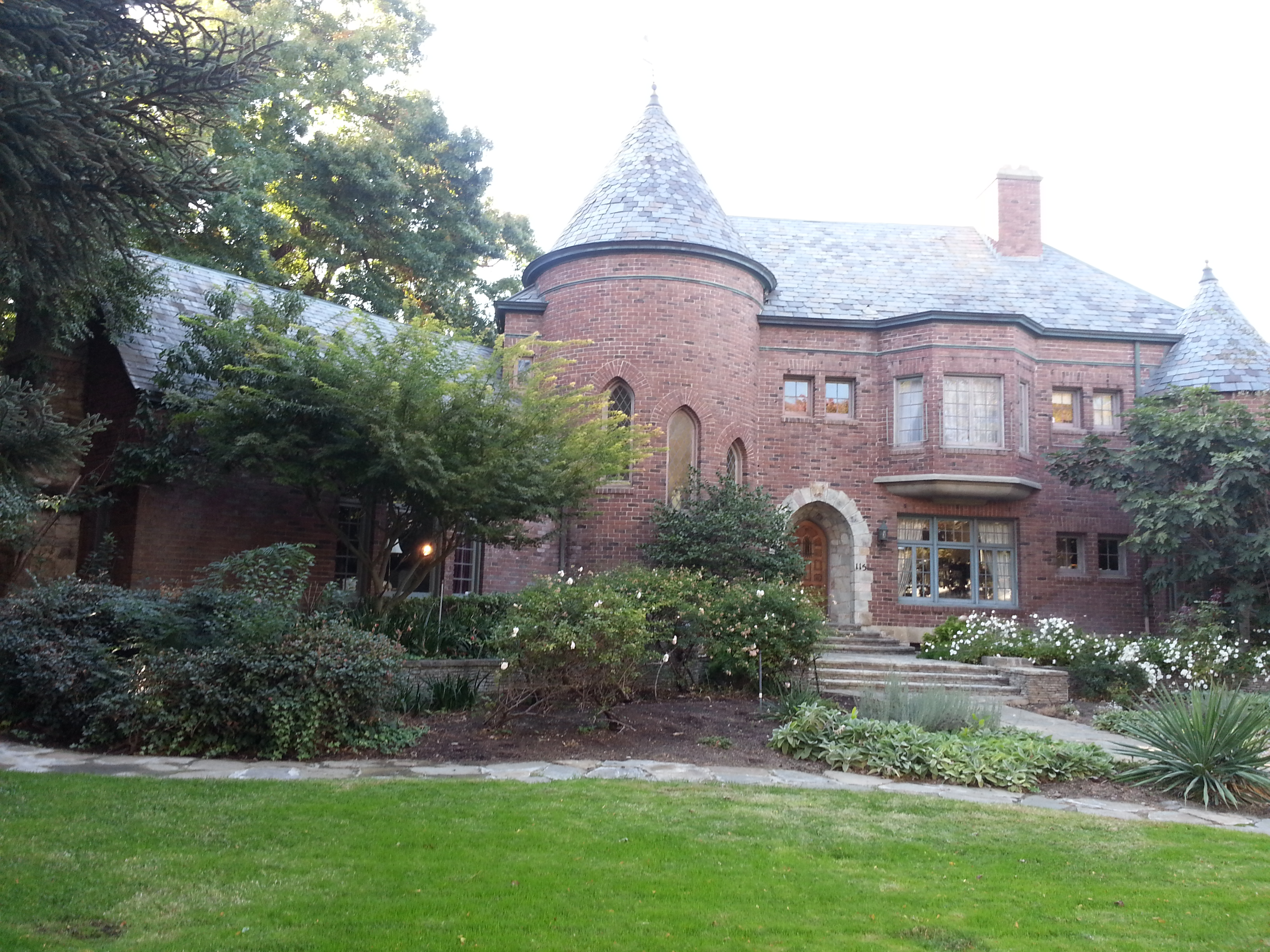
- Hawke Castle in 2013, Modesto, California
- Interactive map of the Hawke Castle area

General information
- Architectural style: Norman
- Location: 115 Magnolia Street Modesto, California, United States
- Coordinates: 37.646303°N 120.99645°W
- Completed: 1929
- Cost: $200,000
- Client: Edwin Hawke

Technical details
- Size: 4,164 sq ft

The Hawke Castle is a historic residence in Modesto, California built in the Norman style in 1929. The home was occupied by Mr. Edward Hawke, who was manager of the Modesto J. C. Penney store at the time. After his death, Mrs. Hawke sold it to engineer Al Goldschmidt and his wife schoolteacher Dorothea Goldschmidt. Next came Dr. Burnett Tonge and wife, Bertha. The house is now property of the Thayer Family Trust. The residence has six bedrooms and four bathrooms, fully designed living area in basement and attic.

In 2018, it was rated as one of the top seven places to visit in Modesto during MADWEEK by the Modesto Bee.
